KFLP may refer to:

 KFLP (AM), a radio station (900 AM) licensed to Floydada, Texas, United States
 KFLP-FM, a radio station (106.1 FM) licensed to Floydada, Texas, United States
 Marion County Regional Airport (ICAO code KFLP)